Bellevue Literary Review (BLR) is an independent literary journal that publishes fiction, nonfiction and poetry about the human body, illness, health and healing. It was founded in 2001 in Bellevue Hospital and was published by the Division of Medical Humanities at NYU School of Medicine. BLR became an independent journal in 2020. Danielle Ofri is the editor-in-chief and co-founder of BLR. The managing editor is Stacy Bodziak, Suzanne McConnell is fiction editor, Sarah Sala is poetry editor, and the nonfiction editor is Damon Tweedy. 

Selections from the BLR have been reprinted in the Pushcart Prize anthology, and have appeared on the notable lists of The Best American Essays, Best American Travel Writing, and The Best American Nonrequired Reading.

BLR hosts an annual writing competition, and free public readings featuring its authors and also hosts the Off the Page performance series with actors giving dramatic readings from the journal. It also offers free study guides and reading group guides, as well as a general discussion guide for its anthology, The Best of The Bellevue Literary Review.

The imprint Bellevue Literary Press was founded in 2007. It was funded through donations by BLR nonfiction editor Jerome Lowenstein.

See also
List of literary magazines

Notes

External links
Bellevue Literary Review
Bellevue Literary Press

Literary magazines published in the United States
Biannual magazines published in the United States
Health magazines
Magazines established in 2001
Medicine and health in fiction
New York University
Magazines published in New York City